Allen Baron (born 1927) is an American television and film director, actor, and comic book artist. 

In his early 20s, he drew romance and science fiction comic stories. Upon visiting a Paramount sound stage in the mid-1950s, he decided he wanted to work in films, and he became involved in theatrical acting. 

He is best known for writing and directing the 1961 film noir Blast of Silence, in which he also plays the lead role of the hitman. He also wrote and directed the 1964 film Terror in the City (alternate title Pie in the Sky), the 1972 film Outside In, and the 1982 film Foxfire Light with Leslie Nielsen and Tippi Hedren.  

For TV, he directed the TV movie The San Pedro Bums (1977), which was the pilot for the TV series The San Pedro Beach Bums.

Baron directed hundreds of television shows, including multiple episodes of The Love Boat, Charlie's Angels, Arnie, Love, American Style, Room 222,  The New Temperatures Rising Show, House Calls, Kolchak: The Night Stalker, and Run, Joe, Run.

References

External links
 

1927 births
American television directors
Living people
People from Brooklyn
American male actors
Date of birth missing (living people)
American film directors